John Charles Hicks Jr. (March 21, 1951 – October 29, 2016) was an American football guard in the National Football League (NFL).  He is best remembered for being the last lineman to be runner-up in the vote for the Heisman Trophy.

College career
In 1970, Hicks came onto the Buckeye scene and won the job as a starting tackle.  He missed the last 6 games of the 1971 season due to a knee injury, and was granted a medical redshirt by the NCAA. He rebounded to put together two spectacular seasons in 1972 and 1973.  During Hicks' three years, Ohio State posted a 28–3–1 record, and each year, Ohio State won the Big Ten Championship and went to the Rose Bowl, making Hicks the first person from OSU to play in three Rose Bowls.

In 1972 Hicks was recognized as a First-team All-America selection and earned his first of two All-Big Ten honors.  He repeated his All-Conference honors his senior year and again earned All-America honors, this time as a unanimous selection.  His stellar senior season and dominance of the line of scrimmage caught the eye of the voters as Hicks won the Lombardi Award as the nation's most outstanding lineman and the Outland Trophy as the nation's best interior lineman.  He was the runner up to running back John Cappelletti of Penn State in the voting for the 1973 Heisman trophy.

The comeback
The 6-3, 258 pound tackle started as a sophomore in 1970 when freshman weren't eligible, and helped them go to the Rose Bowl.  In 1971, he started off the season in dominant fashion before injuring his knee and missing the last six games of the season.  After being granted a medical redshirt by the NCAA, he came back to become an All-American in 1972 helping the Buckeyes to go back to the Rose Bowl. Then he had his monster 1973 season. A first round draft pick of the New York Giants, he was named the NFC Rookie of the Year in 1974. However, injuries would put a halt to his pro career after just 4 seasons.

The Rose Bowls
Hicks was the first player to ever start in three Rose Bowls and was part of a monster Ohio State team.  The unbeaten Buckeyes lost to Stanford 27–17 in the 1971 Rose Bowl.  Next year at the 1973 game, Ohio State got steamrolled by USC 42–17.  But the 1974 Rose Bowl game would be unbeaten Ohio State's year to steamroll USC 42–21 as Hicks led the way to 323 rushing yards.

Professional career
Hicks was drafted by the New York Giants with the 3rd overall selection in the 1974 NFL Draft, of which he was the only college football player invited to attend. He played with the Giants from 1974 through 1977, and in his first 3 seasons he started every regular season game for the team as a right guard.  In April 1978, the Giants traded Hicks to the Pittsburgh Steelers in exchange for offensive lineman Jim Clack and wide receiver Ernie Pough.  Hicks never played for the Steelers.

Honors
 First-team All-American-1972, 1973
 First-team All-Big Ten-1972, 1973
 Second in Heisman Trophy voting-1973
 Outland Trophy Winner-1973
 Lombardi Trophy Winner-1973
 Rose Bowl Hall of Fame-2009

Personal
Hicks was married to Cindy Hicks who was his second wife. He had three daughters and one son with his first wife. He has three granddaughters and two grandsons.

On October 30, 2016, Hicks died at his home due to complications from diabetes.  He was 65.

References

External links
 The John Hicks Company

1951 births
2016 deaths
American football offensive guards
American football offensive tackles
Ohio State Buckeyes football players
New York Giants players
All-American college football players
College Football Hall of Fame inductees
Players of American football from Cleveland